James Aston may refer to:
 Jack Aston (1877–1934), English footballer
 James Aston, 5th Lord Aston of Forfar (1723–1751)